Yauca District is one of thirteen districts of the province Caravelí in Peru. The district is located on the Pan-American Highway.

References

Districts of the Caravelí Province
Districts of the Arequipa Region